(AS) is a Japanese publishing company focused on adult material, such as comics (a.k.a. manga) books, and magazines. The company was established in October 1976.

In 2009, with 65 titles it ranked 2nd among ero-manga publishers in Japan, surpassed only by Core Magazine with 76, and surpassing TI Net (44), Kubo Shoten (42) and Kill Time Communication (41).

At MangaGamer's panel at the 2011 Otakon, MG announced they are expanding their business into digital distribution of Akane Shinsha's erotic manga.

Adaptations

Anime
Some of the manga created by the company were notable enough to be adapted into anime OAVs. These include:
Vanilla Series:
Seme Chichi (based on 2009 manga) animation by Y.O.U.C., produced by Digital Works
Episode 1 released 10 September 2010
Episode 2 released 10 December 2010
Maid-Ane (based on 2010 manga, two OVAs in 2011 that are 27 minutes each) produced and distributed by Digital Works
Episode 1 released 19 August 2011
Episode 2 released 16 December 2011
First Love (ファースト ラブ) by Akiomi Osuzu (based in April 2011 manga, three OVAs in 2012 that are 27 minutes each) was produced by Digital Works and distributed by MS Pictures
First Love 香澄 released 16 March 2012
First Love 千夏 released 15 June 2012
First Love 真琴 released 19 October 2012
Gogo no Kōchō (based in October 2011 manga Junai Mellow) released 21 September 2012

English manga
Digital Manga Inc. has translated and published at least 5 of the works created by Yamatogawa (originally published in the Tenma Comics line) in North America including:
Aqua Bless
Boing Boing
How Good was I?
Power Play!
Witchcraft

Artists employed
Ryō Ramiya published at least 5 works under the company:
Nijiiro Daireikai (匂艶大霊界, June 1990, 
Cruceanu Alex (ミルキ-モ-ニング, August 1993, 
Pretty Afternoon (プリティアフタヌーン, October 1993, 
Misty Twilight (ミスティートワイライト, November 1993, 
Silky Midnight (シルキー ミッドナイト, December 1993, 
Ayato Sasakura publishes under Comic RIN prior to her work illustrating the Shakugan no Shana manga from 2005 to 2011, including:
Shōjo-ryū kōfuku kakushu-ron (少女流幸福攫取論, 2004).

Publications

Comic Tenma magazine
Established in 1998 includes titles:

Aqua Bless (アクアブレス) by Yamatogawa published 24 February 2007
Witchcraft by Yamatogawa published 14 March 2008
translated into English
Tsuki to Taiyō (月と太陽19 Moon and Sun) by  Syatikamaboko published March 2009
Tayu Tayu (たゆたゆ "Boing Boing") by Yamatogawa published 24 April 2009
Seme Chichi (せめ ♥ ちち) by Erect Sawaru (エレクトさわる) published 26 September 2009
adapted into a 2-episode anime OVA in 2010
Taihen Yokudekimashita? (たいへんよくできました "how good was I?") by Yamatogawa published 18 December 2009
Kaichō no Iinari (会長のいいなり！Student Council President's Slave) by Syatikamaboko published 21 May 2010
Maid-Ane (メイド姉) by Maguro Teikoku (まぐろ帝國 Tuna Empire) published 23 July 2010
adapted into a 2-episode anime OVA series in 2011
Imako System (イマコシステム) by Midori no Rūpe published 25 September 2010
First Love (ファースト ラブ) by Akiomi Osuzu published 28 April 2011
adapted into a 3-episode anime OVA series in 2012
Junai Mellow (純愛メロウ Pure Love Mellow) by Jun published 14 October 2011
adapted into a 1-episode anime OVA in 2012
Power Play! (Powerプレイ！) by Yamatogawa published 24 February 2012
Sensei to Issho (先生といっしょ) by Syatikamaboko published 23 March 2012
Nikuman Ko (にくまん娘 Hot, Juicy & Cute Girls in Comics) by Warashibe published 10 August 2012
Ane-Koi (姉恋) by Yuzuki N Dash and Buruman (ぶるまん) by Blmanian both published 27 April 2012

Comic LO magazine
Established in 2002

Comic Rin magazine
Established in 2004 includes titles:

Comic Sigma magazine
Established in 2006 includes titles:

Opera

Tenma Comics
Not to be confused with the "Comic TENMA" magazine, this line of comics includes several subsidiaries:
TENMACOMICS EX
TENMACOMICS LO
TENMACOMICS RIN

References

External links
Official website 
Animeflv

 
1976 establishments in Japan
Adult magazine publishing companies
Book publishing companies in Tokyo
Comic book publishing companies in Tokyo
Publishing companies established in 1976
Hentai companies
Magazine publishing companies in Tokyo
Manga distributors